The discography of Imogen Heap consists of four studio albums, three extended plays, one compilation album, two soundtrack album, 25 singles, five promotional singles, and twelve music videos.

Heap's first album, iMegaphone, was released in 1998. Heap then joined forces with Guy Sigsworth and in 2002 released the album Details under the name Frou Frou. In 2005, Heap released her second studio album, Speak for Yourself. One of the album's singles, "Hide and Seek", went on to be certified Gold by the RIAA. In 2009, Heap released her third studio album, Ellipse, which went on to reach number one on [[Dance/Electronic Albums|''Billboards Electronic Albums]]. In 2011, Heap began work on her fourth album, Sparks, which was released on August 18, 2014, and became her second number-one album on Billboards Electronic Albums chart.

Albums
Studio albums

Compilation albums

Soundtrack albums

Extended plays

Singles
 As lead artist 

As featured artist

Promotional singles

Other charted songs

Guest appearances

Music videos

Songwriting creditsNotes'''

References

Discographies of British artists